Christine B. Meyer  (born 22 January 1964) is a Norwegian business administration academic, politician for the Conservative Party and civil servant. She is Professor of Strategy and Management at the Norwegian School of Economics. Meyer served as Under-Secretary of State in the Ministry of Labour and Government Administration 2001–2003, State Secretary in the Ministry of Labour 2001–2003, Commissioner for Finance, Competition and Government Reform in the city government of Bergen 2007–2009, Commissioner for Health and Inclusion in the city government of Bergen 2009–2011, Director General of the Norwegian Competition Authority 2011–2015 and Director General of Statistics Norway 2015–2017. She was born in Bergen.

References

1964 births
Living people
Politicians from Bergen
Norwegian business theorists
Academic staff of the Norwegian School of Economics
Norwegian state secretaries
Conservative Party (Norway) politicians
Norwegian women in politics
Civil servants from Bergen
Directors of government agencies of Norway